Frasnes-lez-Anvaing is a municipality of Wallonia located in the province of Hainaut, Belgium. 

On 1 January 2018 the municipality had 11,740 inhabitants. The total area is 112.44 km², giving a population density of 100 inhabitants per km². 

The municipality consists of the following districts: Anvaing, Arc-Ainières, Buissenal, Cordes, Dergneau, Forest, Frasnes-lez-Buissenal, Hacquegnies, Herquegies, Montrœul-au-Bois, Moustier, Œudeghien, Saint-Sauveur, and Wattripont.

In August 2012, the funeral of Countess Alix de Lannoy, mother of Stéphanie de Lannoy, was held in Frasnes, attended by members of the Luxembourg and Belgian royal families.

Notes

External links
 
Municipality website
Frasnes-lez-Anvaing et Frasnes-lez-Buissenal 

Municipalities of Hainaut (province)